Malcocinado is a municipality located in the Badajoz Province, Extremadura, Spain. According to the 2005 census (INE), the municipality has a population of 486 inhabitants.

Notable people
Valentín 'El Campesino' González González (1904 – 1983), famous Republican military commander during the Spanish Civil War

References

Municipalities in the Province of Badajoz